Alfred Gomolka (21 July 1942 – 24 March 2020) was a German politician and member of the European Parliament for Mecklenburg-Vorpommern. He also served as the minister president of Mecklenburg-Vorpommern.

Personal life and death
Gomolka was born in Breslau, Germany (now Wrocław, Poland). He had a PhD in geography. He was married and had four children. At one point, Gomolka attempted to set up a new radio station. However, he was unable to compete with Norddeutscher Rundfunk.

Gomolka died on 24 March 2020, aged 77.

Career
Gomolka was a member of the conservative Christian Democratic Union of Germany (CDU).
He joined the CDU at a young age, though he was at times unhappy with the party's alliance with the Socialist Unity Party of Germany (SED). He served on the Greifswald City Council when the area was part of East Germany.

Following German reunification, he served as the first minister president of Mecklenburg-Vorpommern from October 1990 until 1992. In 1990, the CDU took 33 of the 66 seats in the Mecklenburg-Vorpommern state parliament, but was aided by one person transferring from the SED to the CDU and two MPs from the Free Democratic Party (FDP). In 1992, Gomolka was involved in the shipyard crisis, a disagreement between Gomolka and the German Minister for Transport and CDU regional party leader Günther Krause over shipyard policies. Gomolka had wanted to rebuild and then privatise German shipbuilding, whereas Krause wanted to immediately sell the shipyards. They also disagreed on how many ships to sell to Bremer Vulkan. Krause accused Gomolka of incompetence over his handling of the crisis. Krause then overturned Gomolka's shipyard policies. As a result of the crisis, the CDU lost trust in Gomolka, and he left his role as minister president of Mecklenburg-Vorpommern. He remained as a state MP until 1994 and was replaced by Berndt Seite as minister president. From November 1991 until March 1992, Gomolka also served as the president of the German Bundesrat, before being replaced by Berndt Seite.

From 1994 until 2009, Gomolka was an MEP, representing the CDU. He focused upon improving relations with the Baltic states, and was an advocate for Latvia's entry into the European Union. He served as the chairman of the EU delegation to the EU-Latvia Joint Parliamentary Committee. After leaving the EU Parliament, he served as leader of the CDU Seniors' Union for northeast Germany until 2015.

Notes

References

External links

 
 
 CV at the European Parliament website

1942 births
2020 deaths
Politicians from Wrocław
People from the Province of Silesia
MEPs for Germany 2004–2009
University of Greifswald alumni
Academic staff of the University of Greifswald
Presidents of the German Bundesrat
Members of the Landtag of Mecklenburg-Western Pomerania
Christian Democratic Union of Germany MEPs
MEPs for Germany 1994–1999
MEPs for Germany 1999–2004
Ministers-President of Mecklenburg-Western Pomerania
Officers Crosses of the Order of Merit of the Federal Republic of Germany